Vietteania pinna is a moth of the family Noctuidae. It is found in Africa and its presence has been recorded in Congo, Eritrea, Madagascar and Tanzania.

It has a wingspan of 29mm.

References

External links
 Africanmoths: pictures of Vietteania pinna

Hadeninae
Moths described in 1891
Moths of Madagascar
Moths of Africa